The Spit could be:
Southport Spit, Queensland, a permanent sand spit that separates the Southport Broadwater from the Pacific Ocean
The Spit, New South Wales, an urban locality in the suburb of Mosman, New South Wales
Leslie Street Spit, a man-made peninsula in Toronto, Canada
Revenge of the Spit, a Ras Kass mixtape
The Spits, a Seattle based punk musical group
The Spitting Image, a 1998 book by Vietnam veteran Jerry Lembcke

See also 
Spit (disambiguation)